van Eijden is a Dutch surname. Notable people with the surname include:

Rens van Eijden (born 1988), Dutch footballer
Remco van Eijden (born 1977), Dutch darts player
Jan van Eijden (born 1976), German track cyclist

Surnames of Dutch origin